Evangelic Lutheran Lyceum (Evanjelické lyceum) in Bratislava, Slovakia, was founded in 1606 by David Kilger as a Lutheran high school.  Until 1656 was Evangelical Lyceum a school with eight classes, two of them elementary school.  Among its students, from 1829 to 1836, was the young Ľudovít Štúr, who became a member of Czech-Slav Society at the school, an important influence on his life as a Slovak nationalist.

Between 1923 and 1989 the school was closed, but it was reopened in 1991 as a bilingual school, and continues to operate today.

Sources
 Home page (in Slovak)

References

Education in Bratislava
Christian schools in Slovakia
1606 establishments in Europe